Apra is a foundation for socio-economic and political studies in Abkhazia, in opposition to the Government of President Khajimba. It was presented on 9 April 2015 by Aslan Bzhania, who had been the runner-up in the August 2014 presidential election. On 2 March 2016, it voiced its support for a planned referendum to hold an early presidential election.

References

Political parties in Abkhazia
2015 establishments in Abkhazia